Río Pastillo is a river in the municipality of Ponce, Puerto Rico. It is also known as Río Marueño in the area of the municipality where it runs through barrio Marueño. Together with Cañas River, Pastillo forms Matilde River.  Pastillo is one of the 14 rivers in the municipality. The river originates at an altitude of 435 feet. Its tributaries are Quebrada Limon and Quebrada del Agua brooks and the river runs for 19 kilometers before feeding into Río Matilde at a height of 15 feet in Barrio Canas Urbano.

Origin

Río Pastillo has its origin in the northern mountains of Ponce's Barrio Marueño, in an area called Yagrumo.  This river runs for approximately  before reaching barrio Canas in the city of Ponce where it merges with Río Canas to form Matilde River.  The Government of Puerto Rico has plans to canalize this river.

Feeder streams
Quebrada Limón and Quebrada del Agua are two of the main feeder streams to Pastillo River. Quebrada del Agua was diverted via canalization to drain directly to the Caribbean Sea. In times of heavy rainfall, Quebrada del Agua was prone to overflow, as it happened on 7 October 1985, when 16 people died due to its flooding.

Course of the river
The following table summarizes the course of Rio Pastillo in terms of roads crossed. Roads are listed as the river flows from its origin in the mountains of Quebrada Limon, east of the city of Ponce, to its merging with Rio Canas to form Rio Matilde in Barrio Canas (N/A = Data not available):

See also
 List of rivers of Puerto Rico
 List of rivers of Ponce

Notes

References

External links
 USGS Geographic Names Information Service

Rivers of Ponce, Puerto Rico